Dagar may refer to:

Comics 
 Dagar the Invincible, a comic-book series
 Dagar, the Desert Hawk, a comic-book character

People 
 Aminuddin Dagar (1923–2000), Indian classical singer
 Bahauddin Dagar (born 1970), Indian musician
 Mayank Dagar (born 1996), Indian cricketer
 Mukul Dagar (born 1990), Indian cricketer
 Rahim Fahimuddin Dagar (1927–2011), Indian classical singer
 Rahim-ud-in Khan Dagar (1900-1975), Indian classical singer
 Rahul Dagar (born 1993), Indian cricketer
 Satender Dagar, Indian professional wrestler
 Wasifuddin Dagar, Indian classical singer
 Zia Fariduddin Dagar, (1932–2013) Indian classical singer
 Zia Mohiuddin Dagar (1929–1990), Indian classical musician
 Younger Dagar Brothers, Ustad Nasir Zahiruddin (1933–1994) and Ustad Nasir Faiyazuddin (1934–1989), Indian classical singers

Other uses 
 Dagar vani, a stylized singing style in India
 Malana Dagar, a village in Punjab Province, Pakistan
 Röda dagar, a 2013 Erik Linder Christmas album
 Dagar som kommer och går, a 1998 album by Swedish band Kikki Danielssons orkester

See also 
 Dagar Brothers (disambiguation)
 Daggar, Pakistan, a city in Khyber Pakhtunkhwa
 Dagara (disambiguation)
 Dogar (disambiguation)